Magdalena is a district of the province of Chachapoyas in the Amazonas Region of Peru.

Geography
Magdalena is located in the south of the Chachapoyas Province, in the high part of the inter-Andean valley of the river Utcubamba. In the north the district borders with the District of San Isidro of Maino (Chachapoyas) and the District of Levanto (Chachapoyas), in the east with the Rodríguez de Mendoza Province, in the south with the District of The Jalca (Chachapoyas), in the southwest with the District of Saint John of Lopecancha and in the west with the District of Tingo.

See also 
 Machu Pirqa

External links
Magdalena district official website 

Districts of the Chachapoyas Province
Districts of the Amazonas Region